is a Japanese left-handed épée fencer, 2016 team Asian champion, two-time Olympian, and 2021 team Olympic champion.

Along with Koki Kano, Masaru Yamada, and Satoru Uyama, Minobe was a member of the Japanese team that won gold in the team men's épée event at the 2020 Tokyo Olympic Games. It was Japan's first Olympic gold medal in fencing.

Career
Minobe's first sport was volleyball. He took up fencing in high school, on his father's advice. He made his international debut in 2008 and joined the Japanese national team, with whom he won a bronze medal at the 2010 Asian Games in Guangzhou and a silver medal at the 2014 Asian Games in Incheon.

Medal record

Olympic Games

World Championship

Asian Championship

Grand Prix

World Cup

References

External links

1987 births
Living people
People from Echizen, Fukui
Sportspeople from Fukui Prefecture
Japanese male épée fencers
Fencers at the 2016 Summer Olympics
Olympic fencers of Japan
Fencers at the 2010 Asian Games
Fencers at the 2014 Asian Games
Fencers at the 2018 Asian Games
Asian Games gold medalists for Japan
Asian Games silver medalists for Japan
Asian Games bronze medalists for Japan
Asian Games medalists in fencing
Medalists at the 2010 Asian Games
Medalists at the 2014 Asian Games
Medalists at the 2018 Asian Games
Fencers at the 2020 Summer Olympics
Olympic gold medalists for Japan
Medalists at the 2020 Summer Olympics
Olympic medalists in fencing
Left-handed fencers
World Fencing Championships medalists
20th-century Japanese people
21st-century Japanese people